Woodmont is a borough of the city of Milford, in New Haven County, Connecticut. The population was 1,488 at the 2010 census. It was first created by Special Act of Connecticut General Assembly in 1893 as the Woodmont Improvement Association. In 1903 it became the Woodmont Association. It became a municipality in 1957 when the Connecticut General Assembly passed House Bill No. 2443 "An Act to change the Association status of Woodmont to Borough status".

Woodmont is one of 9 Boroughs in Connecticut. The government of the borough works closely with the city of Milford to provide services such as road maintenance, snow plowing, street lighting, beach maintenance, and supplemental police service. There is an extra yearly tax assessment, beyond what is owed to the city of Milford, for borough residents to pay for services in excess of what the city of Milford provides to the rest of Milford.

Geography

A majority of the borough land mass is safely above sea level. However, it does have a few low elevation areas which are subject to flooding during very heavy storm situations (Hurricanes). The most recent, circa 2013 FEMA generated flood map is shown at the right, with the borough border roughly outlined in white.

Demographics

As of the census of 2010, there were 1,488 people, 691 households, and 406 families residing in the borough. The population density was 4960 people per(land) square mile (1,915/km). The racial makeup of the borough was 97.4% White, 1.1% African American, 0.1% Native American, 1.3% Asian, 0.7% from other races, and 0.64% from two or more races. Hispanic or Latino of any race were 5.8% of the population.

There were 762 households, out of which 23.8% had children under the age of 18 living with them, 45.1% were married couples living together, 10.1% had a female householder with no husband present, and 41.3% were non-families. 34.4% of all households were made up of individuals, and 9.3% had someone living alone who was 65 years of age or older.  The average household size was 2.25 and the average family size was 2.91.

In the borough the population was spread out, with 19.5% under the age of 18, 5.8% from 18 to 24, 33.0% from 25 to 44, 27.8% from 45 to 64, and 13.9% who were 65 years of age or older. The median age was 41 years. For every 100 females, there were 94.9 males. For every 100 females age 18 and over, there were 93.7 males.

References

External links
Borough of Woodmont Official Site
Connecticut Housing; Boroughs: Government for the Few by Andree Brooks, NY Times Dec 20, 1981
Living In Woodmont, Conn. by C.J. Hughes, NY Times Aug 6, 2010
FEMA National Flood Hazard Layer, 2013

Milford, Connecticut
Boroughs in Connecticut
Boroughs in New Haven County, Connecticut
Populated coastal places in Connecticut